Cyclopites is a genus of aglaspidid arthropods that lived in shallow seas in what is now Wisconsin during Late Cambrian times. It is distinguished from other aglaspidids by the extreme proximity of its eyes. The genus earns its name from this presence of what might appear to be a single, central eye.

References 

Aglaspidida
Cambrian arthropods of North America

Cambrian genus extinctions